The Alick River (in French: rivière Alick) crosses the municipalities of Saint-Paul-de-Montminy and Notre-Dame-du-Rosaire, in the Montmagny Regional County Municipality, in the administrative region of Chaudière-Appalaches, in Québec, in Canada.

The Alick River is a tributary of the south bank of the Rivière du Sud (Montmagny) which flows first southwest, then northeast to the south bank of St. Lawrence River.

Toponymy 
The toponym Rivière Alick was formalized on December 5, 1968, at the Commission de toponymie du Québec.

See also 

 List of rivers of Quebec

Notes and references 

Rivers of Chaudière-Appalaches
Montmagny Regional County Municipality